The DZJ-08 is a portable, disposable, unguided, shoulder-launched, multipurpose recoilless weapon. The weapon is designed as a multi-role assault weapon aiming to provide anti-armor, anti-fortification, and anti-personnel capability. 

Designed and manufactured by Norinco for the People's Liberation Army, the Type 08 is the successor to the Type 89A multipurpose rocket launcher.

Description
Type 08 has a unique firing mechanism called sealed balance projection possibly inspired by C.Davis recoilless principle. Compared to the previous system, the Type 08 utilizes countermass to reduce the recoil, noise, muzzle flash, pressure wave and back blast that can cause burns and overpressure as well as create conspicuous launch signature of the user. Moreover, Type 08's multipurpose ammunition has a relatively small blast radius of 7 meters, which gives the weapon system a minimum range of 25 meters. Thus, a soldier can fire the weapon more safely inside confined spaces.

The high-explosive ammunition of the DZJ-08 is specially designed to penetrate structures. The warhead contains magnesium and thermite. It can penetrates 25 mm of steel armor at 65° angle, or around 30 mm of steel armor at 0° angle. Although it is not effective against heavy vehicles, the DJZ-08 can still penetrate and destroy lightly armored vehicles like armored personnel carriers. The biggest improvement of DZJ-08 is the ability to penetrate 500 mm of reinforced concrete, whereas the predecessor PF-89A with its multipurpose round can only penetrate 300mm of reinforced concrete.

The Type 08 is China's first attempt to develop an anti-tank weapon that can be used in confined spaces and urban warfare. China used the Type 89 rocket launcher to replace the Type 69 RPG in the 90s, however the problem of back blast became prominent. Since May 2000, Norinco started design of a new generation of weapon that is portable, single-use and can be distributed to each individual soldier of an infantry squad like the Type 89 yet offer low collateral damage.

The DZJ-08 weighs 7.6kg, is water-proof, and features a fordable day sight. The weapon also has a folding front grip and carrying handle. Firing instructions are printed on the left side of the launch tube.

Variants
The DZJ-08 has serval variants with each variant corresponding to a specific type of ammunition. 
DZJ-08 Multipurpose Assault Munition Original variant with multipurpose bunker buster warhead.
DZA-11 Anti-personal Penetrator Penetrator warhead with secondary high-explosive fragmentation fillings.
DZP-11 High-Explosive Anti-Tank Tandem armor-piercing high-explosive anti-tank warhead.

Users
 : People's Liberation Army

See also
 MRO-A
 M72 LAW
 AT-4 CS
 Armbrust
 PF-89
 Davis gun
 Recoilless gun

References

Weapons of the People's Republic of China
Anti-tank rockets
Military equipment introduced in the 2000s